Flavio Villavicencio (born 9 December 1964) is a Cuban weightlifter. He competed in the men's heavyweight II event at the 1992 Summer Olympics.

References

1964 births
Living people
Cuban male weightlifters
Olympic weightlifters of Cuba
Weightlifters at the 1992 Summer Olympics
Place of birth missing (living people)
20th-century Cuban people